Anoncia texanella is a moth in the family Cosmopterigidae. It was described by Vactor Tousey Chambers in 1878. It is found in North America, where it has been recorded from Texas.

References

Arctiidae genus list at Butterflies and Moths of the World of the Natural History Museum

Moths described in 1878
Cosmopteriginae
Moths of North America